This is a list of international football games played by the Comoros national football team from 1979 to 2019.

1979–2007

2008–2014

2015–2019

References

External links

 Men's senior all-time record and Elo rating
 – List of men's senior international matches at RSSSF

1979-2019